A rifle is a firearm designed to be fired from the shoulder, with a barrel that has a helical groove or pattern of grooves ("rifling") cut into the barrel walls. The raised areas of the rifling are called "lands," which make contact with the projectile (for small arms usage, called a bullet), imparting spin around an axis corresponding to the orientation of the weapon.

There are various types of rifles, most notably the automatic rifle, the bolt-action rifle, the lever-action rifle and the semi-automatic rifle.

See also
 List of weapons
 List of firearms
 List of assault rifles
 List of battle rifles
 List of bolt-action rifles
 List of carbines
 List of shotguns
 List of straight-pull rifles
 List of pump-action rifles
 List of machine guns
 List of multiple-barrel firearms
 List of pistols
 List of semi-automatic pistols
 List of revolvers
 List of sniper rifles

References

Rifles